Joyce Hilda Banda (née Ntila; born 12 April 1950) is a Malawian politician who was the President of Malawi from 7 April 2012 to 31 May 2014. Banda took office as President following the sudden death of President Bingu wa Mutharika. She is the founder and leader of the People's Party, created in 2011. An educator and grassroots women's rights activist, she was the Minister of Foreign Affairs from 2006 to 2009 and the Vice-President of Malawi from May 2009 to April 2012. She had served in various roles as a member of Parliament and as Minister of Gender and Child Welfare before she became the President of the Republic of Malawi.

Before her active career in politics, she was the founder of the Joyce Banda Foundation, founder of the National Association of Business Women (NABW), Young Women Leaders Network and the Hunger Project.

Banda was Malawi's fourth president and its first female president and second female head of state, after Elizabeth II. She was the second woman to become the president in the African continent, after Liberia's Ellen Johnson Sirleaf. She was also the country's first female vice-president. In June 2014, Forbes named President Banda as the 40th most powerful woman in the world and the most powerful woman in Africa. In October 2014, she was included in the BBC's 100 Women.

Personal and family life
Joyce Hilda Ntila was born on 12 April 1950 in Malemia, a village in the Zomba District of Nyasaland (now Malawi). Her father was a police brass band musician. She began her career as a secretary and became a well-known figure during the rule of dictator Hastings Banda (no relation).

She has a Cambridge School Certificate, a Bachelor of Arts Degree in Early Childhood Education from Columbus University (an unaccredited distance education institution), a Bachelor of Social Studies in Gender Studies from Atlantic International University (also a distance learning institution) and a Diploma in Management of NGOs from the International Labour Organization (ILO) Centre in Turin, Italy. Currently, she is studying for a Master of Arts Degree in Leadership at Royal Roads University in Canada. She received an honorary doctorate in 2013 from Jeonju University.

She married Roy Kachale, with whom she had three children. At the age 25, she was living in Nairobi, Kenya.

In 1975, a growing women's movement in Kenya motivated Banda to take her three children and leave what she has described as an abusive marriage. Her marriage to Roy Kachele ended in 1981. She is now married to Richard Banda, retired Chief Justice of Malawi, with whom she has two children.

Between 1985 and 1997 Banda managed and established various businesses and organisations including Ndekani Garments (1985), Akajuwe Enterprises (1992), and Kalingidza Bakery (1995). Her success inspired her to help other women achieve financial independence and break the cycles of abuse and poverty.

She is sister to Anjimile Oponyo, former CEO of the Raising Malawi Academy for Girls, financed by Madonna.

Political life

Public offices (1999–2009)

Joyce Banda entered politics in 1999. She won a parliamentary seat in Malawi's third democratic election as a member of President Bakili Muluzi's party, the United Democratic Front. She represented the Zomba Malosa constituency. Muluzi appointed her as Minister for Gender and Community Services. As minister, she fought to enact the Domestic Violence Bill, which had failed for seven years. She designed the National Platform for Action on Orphans and Vulnerable Children and the Zero Tolerance Campaign Against Child Abuse.

In 2004, she was re-elected as a member of Muluzi's Party. Bingu wa Mutharika became President. Even though Banda was not a member of his party, Mutharika appointed her as Minister of Foreign Affairs in 2006. Banda moved to change Malawi's recognition of the legitimate government of China from the Republic of China (on Taiwan) to the People's Republic of China on the mainland; she claimed the switch would bring economic benefits to Malawi. In 2010, China finished the construction of a new parliament building in Lilongwe.

Vice-President (2009–2012)

Banda ran as the vice-presidential candidate of the Democratic Progressive Party (DPP) in the 2009 presidential election, running alongside Mutharika, the DPP presidential candidate. She served as Malawi's first female vice-president. In a surprise move by the DPP, Joyce Banda and second vice-president Khumbo Kachali were fired as the vice-presidents of the DPP on 12 December 2010 for undefined 'anti-party' activities. In attempts to ostracise her, the President continued to give roles that were previously held by her to Callista Mutharika, who was included in the cabinet in September 2011. The court blocked attempts by Mutharika to fire her as Vice-President on constitutional grounds. This included attempts to seize her official government vehicle and to block her from registering her new party. On 8 September 2011, the role of Vice-President was left out in a cabinet reshuffle. However, she was still the legal Vice-President because the post was mandated by the constitution. She was urged by DPP spokesman Hetherwick Ntaba to resign as Vice-President.

Factions in DPP
The relationship between Banda and President Bingu wa Mutharika had become increasingly tense because of Mutharika's attempts to position his own brother, Peter Mutharika, as his successor. Although she was fired from the position as Vice-President of the DPP together with Second Vice-President Khumbo Kachali, she continued to serve as Vice-President of Malawi as stipulated in the constitution. This move led to mass resignations in the DPP and the formation of networks that supported her candidacy to become President of Malawi in the 2014 general election. The DPP denied that mass resignations had occurred and insisted that they were only a few.

People's Party
Joyce Banda is the founder and leader of the People's Party, formed in 2011 after Banda was expelled from the ruling DPP when she refused to endorse President Mutharika's younger brother Peter Mutharika as the successor to the presidency for the 2014 general election.

President (2012 – May 2014)

Transition of power

On 5 April 2012, President Mutharika died. After his death the government failed to notify the public in a timely manner that the president had died. This led to the fear of a constitutional crisis in Malawi.

Agence France-Presse reported Malawi's ex-President Bakili Muluzi as insisting on "constitutional order", saying the vice-president must automatically take power under the constitution. "I am calling for a constitutional order, for continued peace and order. The laws of Malawi are very clear that the vice president takes over when the sitting president can no longer govern. We have to avoid a situation where there is disorder. Let us follow the constitution. We have no choice but follow the constitution. It's very important that there must be peace and calm." Malawi's security forces also wanted the constitutional order to prevail. The Malawi Law Society confirmed that under section 83(4) of the constitution of Malawi, she was the legitimate successor to the Presidency.

On 7 April, Malawi's cabinet sought a court order to block Banda from becoming president. In turn, she phoned the army commander, General Henry Odillo, and asked if he would support her. He agreed and stationed troops around her house.

Joyce Banda was sworn in on 7 April 2012 as President of Malawi, the first woman to hold the office. Chief Justice Lovemore Munlo presided over the ceremony which was held at the National Assembly in Lilongwe. After she was sworn in, Banda appealed for national unity. "I want all of us to move into the future with hope and with the spirit of oneness and unity... I hope we shall stand united and I hope that as a God-fearing nation we allow God to come before us, because if we don't do that then we have failed."

The Malawian and international media reported on Joyce Banda's smooth inauguration. They called it a triumph for democracy. A Malawi Sunday Times editorial said that the new president's inauguration had "helped to entrench and cement a democratic culture in the country."

Cabinet appointments and loss of 2014 presidential election

On 26 April 2012, President Banda chose her cabinet, composed of 23 ministers and nine deputy ministers. She gave herself several key portfolios to strengthen her own power as the country's leader.

On 10 October 2013, a few days after returning from a trip to the UN, President Joyce Banda sacked her cabinet following the Capital Hill Cashgate scandal. On 15 October, a new cabinet was appointed, and notably Finance Minister Ken Lipenga and Justice Minister Ralph Kasambara were dropped from the cabinet.

In May 2014 Joyce Banda was heavily defeated in the presidential election. She failed in an attempt to nullify the election. She did not attend the swearing in of the winner, Peter Mutharika, but offered him her congratulations. She lived outside Malawi beginning in 2014. A warrant for her arrest in connection with alleged corruption during her stint as President was announced on 31 July 2017, although she remained outside the country. She denied the charges and said that she would return to face them.

International relations

During Mutharika's presidency, Malawi was left in a poor economic situation due to foreign relations under the Mutharika administration. Within the last year of Mutharika's presidency, Britain, the United States, Germany, Norway, the European Union, the World Bank, and the African Development Bank had all suspended financial aid. They had expressed concern about Mutharika's attacks on democracy domestically and his increasingly erratic policies. In March 2012, Mutharika told these foreign donors to "go to hell." He accused them of plotting to bring down his government.
Part of Banda's challenge as president was to restore diplomatic ties with the aid donors. She also had the challenge of restoring diplomatic ties with Malawi's neighbours like Mozambique, and regional countries such as Botswana.

Within the first week of her presidency, Banda launched a diplomatic offensive to repair Malawi's international relations. She spoke to Henry Bellingham of the United Kingdom's Foreign Office. He assured her that a new British envoy will be sent "within the shortest time possible." She spoke to the United States Secretary of State Hillary Clinton. Clinton promised to resume discussions on the $350 million energy grant as soon as possible. Banda announced plans to speak to Baroness Ashton of the European Union's Foreign Affairs office and the Malawi's IMF Resident Representative, Ruby Randall. She and Zambian president Michael Sata had also conferred about resuming close working relations. At least partly to further please donors, Banda's administration also refused in June 2012 to host that July's African Union summit on the grounds that the AU had insisted that Sudan's president Omar al-Bashir be given assurances that Malawi would refuse to serve the International Criminal Court arrest warrant against him; the Cabinet decided that such conditions were unacceptable. President Banda is named by Forbes as the 40th most powerful woman in the world, the highest African name on the list.

Domestic policy

On 18 May 2012, Banda announced her intention to overturn Malawi's ban on homosexuality. The measure was reported to already have the support of a majority of MPs. If successful, it would make Malawi the second African nation to legalise same-sex sexual activity since 1994. Amnesty International reported in early November 2012 that Malawi had "suspended" laws criminalising homosexuality pending a vote.

On the advice of the International Monetary Fund, in May 2012 Banda devalued the Malawian kwacha, something Mutharika had refused to do. The announcement of the kwacha's devaluation by 33 per cent against the United States dollar, an attempt to attract donor funding, prompted "panic-buying" in Malawian cities, the BBC News reported.

Upon becoming President, Banda decided to sell her presidential jet and make a contribution of 30% of her salary to benefit the Malawi Council for the Handicapped. However, proceeds from the sale of the jet were not accounted for. An explanation given by Joyce Banda was that the jet had been sold to an arms company in South Africa with whom the Government of Malawi had an outstanding debt and so the jet was used to offset this debt. No paperwork or evidence was made available to back up that claim. On 17 January 2013, thousands of Malawians protested in Blantyre against rising inflation after Banda, joined by IMF chief Christine Lagarde, defended the devaluation of the kwacha and said she would not reverse the decision.

Presidential Initiatives 
President Banda has shown consistent commitment to maternal health and reproductive rights, specifically through her support of safe motherhood in Malawi. She showed her support through establishing the Presidential Initiative on Maternal Health and Safe Motherhood. In only two years, this Initiative showed a reduction in maternal mortality ratios from 675 deaths per 100,000 live births to 460 deaths per 100,000 live births.

Flag

After the flag was changed in 2010 by the Mutharika government, there was public opposition. Many groups challenged the legitimacy of the flag. On 28 May 2012, Banda led the nation's MPs to vote to revert the flag back to its independence flag, which was originally adopted in 1964. All parties, except the DPP, voted in favour of reverting to the independence flag.

Post-presidential life
Banda stayed in self-imposed exile in the United States as a distinguished fellow at the Woodrow Wilson Center and Center for Global Development for three years, prior to returning to Malawi in 2018. To date, no charges have been formally filed against Banda.

Banda entered the 2019 presidential election as a candidate for the People's Party, but withdrew her candidacy two months before the election; she later endorsed opposition candidate Lazarus Chakwera. After the 2019 presidential election was annulled, she endorsed Chakwera again in the 2020 re-do. Banda's son Roy Kahele-Banda was named to Chakwera's cabinet as Minister of Industry.

Joyce Banda Foundation
Before becoming vice-president, she was the founder and CEO of the Joyce Banda Foundation. for better Education, a charitable foundation that assists Malawian children and orphans through education. It is a complex of primary and secondary schools in the Chimwankhunda area of Blantyre. It includes an orphan care center that consists of six centres and 600 children. It also assists the surrounding villages by providing micro-credit to 40 women and 10 youth groups. It provided seeds to over 10,000 farmers and has provided other donations. The foundation has constructed four clinics in four of the 200 villages it assists. The foundation also assists in rural development. It has a partnership with the Jack Brewer Foundation, a global development foundation founded by NFL star, Jack Brewer.

National Association of Business Women
Banda is the founder of the National Association of Business Women in Malawi that was established in 1990. It is a registered non-profit foundation in Malawi. The association aims to lift women out of poverty by strengthening their capacity and empowering them economically. This is a social network of 30,000 women, dedicated to supporting women's businesses and supporting women who want to participate in business. Its activities include business training, technical training, record keeping and management skills. They work towards creating dialogue with policymakers to make policies favourable to women business owners. Its current director is Mary Malunga. The foundation has had a partnership with the Netherlands-based Humanist Institute for Development Cooperation (Hivos) at The Hague since 2003.

Philanthropy and development initiatives
Banda has been involved with many grassroots projects with women since the age of 25 to bring about policy change, particularly in education. She founded the Joyce Banda Foundation for Better Education. She founded the Young Women Leaders Network, National Association of Business Women and the Hunger Project in Malawi. She (jointly with President Joaquim Chissano of Mozambique) was awarded the 1997 Africa Prize for Leadership for the Sustainable End of Hunger by the Hunger Project, a New York-based non-governmental organisation. She used the prize money to fund the building of the Joyce Banda foundation for children. In 2006, she received the International Award for the Health and Dignity of Women for her dedication to the rights of the women of Malawi by the Americans for United Nations Population Fund.

She served as commissioner for "Bridging a World Divided" alongside personalities such as Bishop Desmond Tutu, and United Nations Human Rights Commissioner, Mary Robinson. Banda was also member of the Advisory Board for Education in Washington DC, and on the advisory board for the Federation of World Peace and Love in Taiwan (China).

As part of a government move on austerity measures in October 2012, Banda cut her salary by 30%. She also announced that the presidential jet would be sold.

Global Leaders Council for Reproductive Health
In 2010, Banda became a member of the Global Leaders Council for Reproductive Health, a group of sixteen sitting and former heads of state, high-level policymakers and other leaders committed to advancing reproductive health for lasting development and prosperity. Chaired by former President of Ireland Mary Robinson, these leaders seek to mobilise the political will and financial resources necessary to achieve universal access to reproductive health by 2015 – a key target of the UN Millennium Development Goals.

Accolades

National awards
 Woman of the Year, Malawi, 1997
 Woman of the Year, Malawi, 1998
 Nyasa Times Multimedia 'Person of the Year', 2010

International awards
 Martin Luther King Drum Major Award, 2012, Washington DC
Legends Award for Leadership, 2012, Greater African Methodist Episcopal Church
 Women of Substance Award, 2010, African Women Development Fund
 Africa Prize for Leadership for the Sustainable End of Hunger, 1997, Hunger Project of NY
 International award for entrepreneurship development, 1998, Africa Federation of Woman Entrepreneurs and Economic Commission for Africa (ECA)
 100 Heroines award, 1998, Rochester, New York
 Certificate of Honors, 2001, Federation of World Peace and Love, Taiwan, Republic of China

Honors
Most powerful woman in the world 2014, Forbes Magazine – rank #40
Most powerful woman in the world 2013, Forbes Magazine – rank #47
Most powerful woman in the world 2012, Forbes Magazine – rank #71
Most powerful woman in Africa 2012, Forbes Magazine – rank #1
Most powerful woman in Africa 2011, Forbes Magazine – rank #3

See also
Malawian Constitutional Crisis 2012
List of current members of the National Assembly of Malawi

Further reading

References

External links

 United Nations 1997 Africa Prize
 

|-

|-

Banda, Joyce
21st-century women politicians
Female foreign ministers
Female heads of government
Female heads of state
Women rulers in Africa
Foreign Ministers of Malawi
Democratic Progressive Party (Malawi) politicians
Living people
Malawian feminists
People from Zomba District
People's Party (Malawi) politicians
Presidents of Malawi
United Democratic Front (Malawi) politicians
Vice-presidents of Malawi
Women government ministers of Malawi
Malawian women diplomats
Women vice presidents
Center for Global Development
Women presidents
BBC 100 Women
21st-century Malawian women politicians
21st-century Malawian politicians
Malawian women's rights activists